Christian Jacques Rashad Ringo (born March 10, 1992) is an American football nose tackle who is a free agent. He played college football at Louisiana and was drafted by the Green Bay Packers in the sixth round of the 2015 NFL Draft.

Professional career

Green Bay Packers

2015 season
Ringo was selected in the sixth round (210th overall) by the Green Bay Packers in the 2015 NFL Draft. On May 8, 2015, he signed a contract with the Packers. Ringo was released by the Packers during final team cuts on September 5, 2015. On September 7, 2015, he was signed to the Packers' practice squad. Packers' linebacker Jayrone Elliott commented on Ringo in mid-November, saying he had become "the captain of the scout team". Halfway through the season, Ringo had at least one team wanting to sign him to their active roster. However, he decided to accept an offer with the Packers to increase his salary while continuing to play on the practice squad. Ringo was re-signed by the Packers after the season ended on January 18, 2016.

2016 season
Ringo recorded four tackles and two sacks in the preseason, earning him a spot on the Packers' 53-man roster. He made his NFL debut against the Jacksonville Jaguars in the season opener, finishing the game with one tackle.

2017 season
On April 13, 2017, Ringo signed his exclusive rights tender to remain with the Packers. He was waived by the Packers on September 5, 2017.

Cincinnati Bengals
On September 6, 2017, Ringo was claimed off waivers by the Cincinnati Bengals. He was waived by the team on September 12, 2017.

Detroit Lions
On September 14, 2017, Ringo was signed to the Detroit Lions' practice squad. He was promoted to the active roster on November 22, 2017.

On August 31, 2018, Ringo was waived by the Lions.

Dallas Cowboys
On September 26, 2018, Ringo was signed to the Dallas Cowboys' practice squad. He was promoted to the active roster on November 17, 2018, but was waived two days later and re-signed to the practice squad.

Cincinnati Bengals (second stint)
On November 23, 2018, Ringo was signed by the Cincinnati Bengals off the Cowboys practice squad.

He was waived with an injury settlement during final roster cuts on August 30, 2019.

Winnipeg Blue Bombers
Ringo signed with the Winnipeg Blue Bombers of the Canadian Football League (CFL) on July 1, 2020. After the CFL canceled the 2020 season due to the COVID-19 pandemic, Ringo chose to opt-out of his contract with the Argonauts on August 28, 2020.

New Orleans Saints
On November 11, 2020, Ringo was signed to the New Orleans Saints' practice squad. He was released on January 11, 2021. On January 18, 2021, Ringo signed a reserve/futures contract with the Saints.

Arizona Cardinals
On July 29, 2022, Ringo signed with the Arizona Cardinals. He was released on August 30, 2022.

New Orleans Saints (second stint)
On August 31, 2022, Ringo was signed to the New Orleans Saints practice squad. He was released on October 20.

Baltimore Ravens
On December 28, 2022, Ringo was signed to the Baltimore Ravens practice squad. He was released on January 10, 2023.

NFL career statistics

References

External links
Green Bay Packers bio
Louisiana–Lafayette Ragin' Cajuns bio

1992 births
Living people
Players of American football from Jackson, Mississippi
American football defensive tackles
American football defensive ends
Louisiana Ragin' Cajuns football players
Green Bay Packers players
Cincinnati Bengals players
Detroit Lions players
Dallas Cowboys players
Winnipeg Blue Bombers players
New Orleans Saints players
Baltimore Ravens players